The Royal Typewriter Company is a manufacturer of typewriters founded in January 1904. It was headquartered in New York City with its factory in Hartford, Connecticut.

History

The Royal Typewriter Company was founded by Edward B. Hess and Lewis C. Myers in January 1904 in a machine shop in Brooklyn, New York. The next year, Hess and Myers turned to Thomas Fortune Ryan, to whom they demonstrated a prototype typewriter. Their machine had numerous innovations including a friction-free, ball-bearing, one-track rail to support the weight of the carriage, a new paper feed, a lighter and faster typebar action, and complete visibility of the words as they are typed. Ryan put up $220,000 in exchange for financial control.

In March 1906 the first Royal typewriter, the Royal Standard, was sold. The Royal Standard was set apart from its competition by its 'flatbed' design.

With demand increasing, Royal purchased 5¼ acres in Hartford, Connecticut, as the new site for its manufacturing facility. In 1908, Royal began manufacturing there and in time, Royal and cross town competitor, Underwood Typewriter Company, would make Hartford the “Typewriter Capitol of the World”.

In 1911, Royal introduced the Royal 5 typewriter, which also utilized the "flatbed" design.

Royal's first model utilizing the "upright" design was the Royal 10, which came out in 1914. Original models had two beveled glass panes on each side.

In 1926 Royal introduced the "Roytype" brand name for its line of typewriter ribbons and carbon paper.

Royal entered the portable typewriter market in 1926 - years behind its competitors such as Underwood, LC Smith Corona, and Remington.

In order to promote the new portable Royal president G. E. Smith secured the exclusive sponsorship of the September 23, 1926, Dempsey–Tunney championship fight for $35,000. This boxing match was the first nationwide radio hook-up.

"The Daily News" of New York estimated that 20 million fans from coast to coast listened to the broadcast.

Royal's introduction of its portable line of typewriters was an immediate success and launched the company to become the world's #1 selling typewriter brand.

On October 9, 1926, the "Hartford Daily Courant" reported that Royal had just produced its one millionth typewriter.

To promote the ruggedness of its typewriters, George Edward Smith, president of Royal, bought a Ford-Stout tri-motor airplane in August 1927. This plane, commonly called the Royal Airtruck, dropped over 200 typewriters in crates with parachutes to dealers over the eastern seaboard of the USA on its maiden flight. Royal eventually delivered over 11,000 typewriters this way with only ten being damaged.

In January 1941, Edward B. Hess, one of Royal's founders and vice presidents, died in Orlando, Florida. Hess was a prolific inventor and held over 140 patents relating to the typewriter.

World War II brought tremendous change to Royal. In order to aid the war effort, Royal converted its manufacturing to war work exclusively. Royal manufactured machine guns, rifles, bullets, propellers, and spare parts for airplane engines. It wouldn't be until September 1945 that Royal started typewriter production full-time again and not until December 1948 that it caught up on its pre-war backlog.

In 1947, Royal produced, in limited quantity, a gold-plated version of its popular Quiet Deluxe model. Ian Fleming, the British novelist who wrote the James Bond novels, used one. Many other writers, including Ernest Hemingway, used a Royal typewriter.

Other typewriter manufacturers utilized Royal's innovations in their typewriters. In 1947, Royal won patent suits against Remington and LC Smith Corona.

In February 1950, Royal introduced its first electric typewriter.

Lewis C. Myers, the surviving founder of the Royal Typewriter Company, died in Freeport, New York at the age of 84.

Worldwide demand caused Royal to open a new factory in Leiden, the Netherlands, to produce typewriters in 1953.

In April 1954, the Royal typewriter Company announced its plan to merge with McBee, a leading manufacturer of accounting and statistical machines and supplies. By July, Royal stockholders had approved the plan and Royal McBee was formed.

From 1954 to 1964 sales soared from $84.7 million to over $113 million. Royal McBee was consistently listed as a Fortune 500 company.

In December 1957, Royal announced it had just produced its 10 millionth typewriter. Congratulations were received from U.S. Secretary of Commerce Sinclair Weeks and the Governor of Connecticut, Abe Ribicoff.

In December 1964, Litton Industries' stockholders approved the acquisition of Royal McBee. The deal became final in March 1965. Litton would change the name of Royal McBee back to Royal Typewriter and reorganize the company into five divisions: Royal Typewriter, Roytype Consumer Products, Roytype Supplies, McBee Systems, and RMB.

October 1966 saw Litton announce plans to acquire the English typewriter producer Imperial, through its Royal Typewriter division.

In January 1969, Litton Industries further cemented its hold on the typewriter market by purchasing the German typewriter manufacturer, Triumph Adler. Almost immediately, the U.S. government filed an anti-trust suit against Litton accusing it of creating a monopoly. The FTC ruled in March 1973 that Litton had to divest itself of Triumph Adler. Litton appealed and, in a rare reversal, the FTC issued a ruling in April 1975 stating that Litton could keep Triumph Adler.

In March 1979, Volkswagen, seeking to diversify, announced its intention to acquire a 55% stake in Triumph Adler. Included in the deal was Royal Typewriter.

Sales continued to climb and by 1982 sales in North America of Royal and Triumph Adler totaled over $600 million.

In April 1986, Olivetti, the Italian typewriter/computer manufacturer, announced plans to purchase Triumph Adler and Royal from Volkswagen. For nearly two decades Royal was a part of the Olivetti family.

In September 2004, Royal became a private American company again.

Now known as Royal Consumer Information Products Inc., Royal’s product line has evolved to include cash registers, shredders, personal digital assistants (PDAs)/electronic organizers, postal scales, weather stations, and a wide range of original and compatible/remanufactured imaging supplies supporting today’s most popular printers, faxes, and copiers.

As of 2019, Royal is still introducing new typewriters under the Royal brand name.

Typewriters

During the 1980s, Royal also produced consumer daisy wheel printers like the Royal LetterMaster and Royal OfficeMaster 2000, the former being a cheaper model.

Computers

Royal McBee sold and serviced early computers RPC-4000 and RPC-9000. Royal McBee partnered with General Precision in the Royal Precision Electronic Computer Company, which sold and serviced the LGP-30 (in 1956) and LGP-21 (in 1963) single-user desk computers manufactured by the Librascope division of General Precision. Royal McBee was based in Port Chester, New York.

The RPC-4000 is the computer on which Mel Kaye performed a legendary programming task in machine code, as told by Ed Nather in the hacker epic The Story of Mel.

In popular culture
A Royal typewriter is a large story element in Stephen King's novel Misery.

60 Minutes correspondent Morley Safer was known to write all of his scripts on a Royal typewriter.

A Royal typewriter with a Prestige Elite typeface was one of the items found at Zodiac suspect Arthur Leigh Allen's apartment, matching the typewriter the Zodiac killer used to write letters sent to the Riverside Police Department.

Jessica Fletcher used a Royal typewriter to write her novels.

Mason Williams threw a Royal Model X typewriter out of a speeding car driven by Ed Ruscha for their art book Royal Road Test (1967).

See also

 Edge-notched card The McBee Company, which merged with Royal Typewriter in 1954, manufactured Keysort cards and accessories from the 1930s

References

External links
 Royal company website
 Royal Facebook Page

Manufacturing companies established in 1904
Typewriters